Madhabdev University is a public state university located in Narayanpur, Assam. The university is established by The Assam Act No. XXXV of 2017 which was passed by the Government of Assam on 7 September 2017. It was created by upgrading Madhavdev College of Narayanpur, North Lakhimpur.

On 14 June 2019 Dibakar Chandra Deka took charge as the first Vice-Chancellor of Madhavdev University. It was named after Sri Sri Madhavdev, an  important preceptor of the Ekasarana Dharma known for his loyalty to his guru, Srimanta Sankardev.

History
The first meeting for the establishment of the college was held on 24 November 1963 at Madhavpur Higher Primary School near Narayanpur town and in 1964 the college was established as Narayanpur College.  The first president was Kamal Gogoi and the founding secretary was the freedom fighter Purnananda Dutta . The first ad hoc management committee of the college was formed on 1st July of that year. In the first year, there were 75 students and 5 teachers in the departments of English, Assamese, Political Science, History and Economics  The college was renamed as Madhavdev College on 2 August,1966.

In 1964, University of Guwahati and in 1965, Dibrugarh University accredited the pre-university class.  The college received its graduation course from Dibrugarh University in 1967. The Science Branch was started in 1978.

Photo Gallery

References 

Universities in Assam
2019 establishments in Assam
Educational institutions established in 2019
State universities in India